James Jackson Storrow II (1864–1926) was a Boston-area lawyer and investment banker instrumental in forming General Motors, and was its third president (for just two months, 1910–11). Storrow was a business partner of Henry Lee Higginson, founder of the Boston Symphony Orchestra. He served on the Boston City Council, 1915-1918.

Early and family life
The son of prominent Boston lawyer and Episcopalian James Jackson Storrow (1837-1897) and his first wife, Anna Maria Perry (who died in 1865), J.J. Storrow II had a younger brother Samuel (born 1865, Harvard Class of '87) and elder sister Elizabeth Randolph Storrow (born 1862). He attended Harvard College, Class of '85. His grandfather, Charles Storer Storrow, was the chief engineer of the company that built the Great Stone Dam and textile mill complex in Lawrence, Massachusetts, while his great-grandfather was the celebrated naval hero Oliver Hazard Perry.

Storrow met Helen Osborne, daughter of a prominent and activist upstate New York family (whose brother also attended Harvard), while attempting to scale the Matterhorn in Switzerland. They married and had only one son, James Jackson Storrow III (1892-1977), although they had hoped for a large family. Helen Storrow became a prominent international Girl Scout leader, and both became known for social activism in Boston and New England.

Business career
Storrow graduated from Harvard Law School in 1888, and practiced corporate law for twelve years. In 1900, shortly after his father's death, he disbanded his law firm and accepted a position at Lee, Higginson & Co., an investment bank. An astute businessman, he soon became the senior partner at Lee, Higginson & Co., and accumulated a vast personal fortune. Storrow also served as a Harvard College overseer from 1897-1909. He was a founder of the Harvard Magazine.

In 1910, Storrow led a group of financiers organized as a voting trust who wrested control of General Motors from that corporation's founder Billy Durant. Storrow, also on the board of the American Locomotive Company, introduced junior ALCO executive Walter Chrysler to GM's Charles Nash, who gave Chrysler the opportunity to revive the Buick division. Storrow served as GM's president for two months, and on its board until 1916, when Durant regained control.

Public service
Storrow also took a keen interest in his city and became known for his advocacy of civil service, educational and legal reforms. Although he lost his sole attempt to become Boston's mayor (in 1909), Storrow served several terms on the Boston City Council and Boston School Committee, and was New England Fuel Administrator during World War I.

Unlike many of his Boston Brahmin peers, Storrow rejected nativism and anti-Catholic, anti-Semitic and anti-immigrant prejudices. As its first president, he helped diversify the Boston Chamber of Commerce, as well as to establish a juvenile court. A prominent Democrat, Storrow also often served as a mediator between corporate interests, the city, and labor unions.

In 1901, Storrow began a campaign to dam the Charles River and create the Charles River Basin, as well as to preserve and improve the riverbanks as a public park. The Massachusetts legislature approved the dam in 1903, and it was completed in 1910. The basin also eliminated tidal harbor pollution and the basin's low-tide odors.

In 1919, Boston faced a possible strike by its police officers who were seeking the right to form a union under a charter from the American Federation of Labor. With police Commissioner Edwin U. Curtis at odds with the rank and file police, Boston Mayor Andrew J. Peters appointed Storrow to chair an ad hoc Citizen's Committee to review the matter. Storrow's group recommended that the police be allowed to form their own union, but that it should be independent and not affiliated with any other organization like the AFL. Commissioner Curtis rejected the recommendation and Boston experienced a dramatic police strike.

Storrow became the second national president of the Boy Scouts of America, serving from 1925 until his death in 1926. He posthumously received the fifth Silver Buffalo Award, presented in 1926.

Death and legacy
Storrow died in New York City, survived by his wife and son. He was buried at Lincoln Cemetery in Middlesex County, Massachusetts, and Helen commissioned a sculpture Boy and His Dog by Cyrus Dallin as a memorial to him that was placed close by.  She was interred beside him after her death in 1944.

Storrow Drive, a highway that now runs along the Charles River, is named for him, despite his never having advocated such a highway and his wife's vocal opposition to it.

See also 

History of the Boy Scouts of America

References

Further reading
Henry Greenleaf Pearson, Son of New England: James Jackson Storrow 1864-1926 (Boston: T. Todd & Co., 1932)
 "James J. Storrow, Noted Banker, Dies". New York Times. March 14, 1926. page E11

1864 births
1926 deaths
Lawyers from Boston
Boston City Council members
American bankers
Harvard Law School alumni
Harvard College alumni
Presidents of the Boy Scouts of America
19th-century American lawyers